Coenobela is a genus of moths of the family Erebidae. The genus was erected by George Hampson in 1926.

Species
Coenobela joha H. Druce, 1898
Coenobela paucula Walker, 1858

References

Calpinae